Liyanagemulla (Sinhalese: ලියනගෙමුල්ල Tamil: லியனகேமுல்ல) is a village situated in Gampaha District , Western Province , Sri Lanka lying near the west coast to the south of the city of Negombo and is administered by the katunayake seeduwa urban council. It is located 30 km from Colombo, and 12 km from Negombo. It is on the Katunayake-Colombo road (A03) and is located a few miles from the Bandaranaike International Airport and Katunayake Export Processing Zone.

Transport 

Rail

 The village is served by a station on the north coast line of the national railway network. The Liyanagemulla Railway Station is on the Colombo-Puttalam Railway Line, and is the 17th railway station from Colombo.

Road

  Colombo – Katunayake Expressway opened in 2013 links the capital Colombo through the Katunayake Interchange.
 The A3 main road from Colombo, goes through Negombo, extends to Jaffna, and Trincomalee via Anuradhapura.

Geography
 Liyanagemulla is located at 7°08'45.8"N 79°52'25.0"E (7.146043, 79.873615).
 The village has a total area: 980,231.05 m² (10,551,119.19 ft²) Total distance: 4.01 km (2.49 mi).

Place names near Liyanagemulla
Katunayake
Seeduwa
 Mukalangamuwa
 Amandoluwa
 Jayawardanapura
 Awariwatta
 Lion City

Education 
 St. Thomas' Catholic International College
 Sailan International School

Religion 

Catholic & Christian Churches
 St. Anthony's Church (කැලෑ පල්ලිය)

Buddhist Temple
 Liyanagemulla Temple

Buddhist Temple
 Suvisuddarama Temple

See also 
 Seeduwa
 Kurana
 Kandawala

References 

Populated places in Gampaha District